No Sacrifice, No Victory is the seventh studio album by Swedish heavy metal band HammerFall, released 20 February 2009. It was partly recorded at PAMA Studios, Torsås and partly at  Andy La Rocque's Sonic Train Studios in Varberg. This is the first album featuring the band's new lead guitarist Pontus Norgren,  the return of bassist Fredrik Larsson who played bass from 1994 to 1997, as well as the first to have the band tuning all of their guitars in all songs to D tuning as opposed to the E-flat tuning seen on most songs from all previous albums.

Track listing

Personnel
 Joacim Cans - lead vocals
 Oscar Dronjak - guitars, backing vocals
 Pontus Norgren - guitars, backing vocals
 Anders Johansson - drums
 Fredrik Larsson - bass, backing vocals
 Jens Johansson - keyboard solo on "Something for the Ages" and church organ on "Between Two Worlds"
 Stefan Elmgren - additional guitar solo on "Bring the Hammer Down"
 Samwise Didier - cover art

Chart positions

Song description
Drummer Anders Johansson knew No Sacrifice, No Victory was an important record as it was the first since their debut Glory to the Brave (1997) without the guitarist Stefan Elmgren. But Johansson is confident and explains every song in his own words:

References

External links
Official HammerFall website
Album information
Lyrics at Darklyrics

2009 albums
HammerFall albums
Nuclear Blast albums
Albums produced by Charlie Bauerfeind